Furat, Forat, Foorat, Al-Furat, Al-Foorat or Al-Forat may refer to:

Places
 Euphrates (Arabic: الفرات, al-Furāt), the longest river in West Asia
 Al-Furat Dam, or Tabqa Dam, upstream from Raqqa, Syria
 Forat, Iran, a village in Semnan Province

People
 Banu'l-Furat, a 9th–10th century Shia family of civil functionaries of the Abbasid Caliphate
 Abu'l-Abbas Ahmad ibn al-Furat (died 904)
 Abu'l-Hasan Ali ibn al-Furat (855–924)
 Abu'l-Abbas ibn al-Furat (died 1014/5)
 Ja'far ibn al-Furat (921–1001)
 Ibn al-Furat (1334–1405), an Egyptian historian
 Asad ibn al-Furat (759–828), a jurist and theologian from Ifriqiya
 Bruce Forat, an electronics engineer, founder of Forat Electronics
 Mun'im Furat (1900–1972), an Iraqi artist

Media
 Al Forat, a satellite TV network in Iraq
 Al-Furat (newspaper, Deir ez-Zor), a newspaper in Deir ez-Zor, Syria
 Al-Furat (newspaper, Australia), an Arabic-language newspaper in New South Wales, Australia
 AlFurat Media Center, an Islamic State media organization

Other uses
 Al-Forat FC, an Iraqi football club
 Al-Furat University, a university in Deir ez-Zor, Syria
 Forat F9000, a drum machine and MIDI sequencer
 Forat F16, drum machine

See also